Angelita Detudamo (born 31 October 1986 in Denigomodu) is a Nauruan female tennis player.

During her first year of playing for Pacific Oceania at the 2004 Fed Cup, Detudamo has a win–loss record of 2–1.

Fed Cup participation

Doubles

References

External links 
 
 

Nauruan female tennis players
People from Denigomodu District
1986 births
Living people